Kakkai Siraginilae is a 2000 Tamil-language drama film written and directed  by P. Vasu. Parthiban and Preetha Vijayakumar star, whilst Manasa, K. Viswanath, Lakshmi, Visu, and Vadivelu play supporting roles. Actress Vanitha Vijayakumar worked as the assistant director for this film. The music was composed by Ilaiyaraaja with editing by P. Mohanraj and cinematography by R. Raghunatha Reddy.

The film released on 10 March 2000.

Plot
Vellaisamy (Parthiban) is an orphan who was brought up by a Brahmin couple, Sambasiva Iyer (K. Viswanath) and Savithri (Lakshmi). Vellaisamy is very loyal and attached to the old couple. They also look after Vellaisamy as their own son. Gayatri (Preetha Vijayakumar) is the only daughter of the couple who returns from the city after completing her education. Vellaisamy is very much attached to Gayatri also, and he looks after her as a kid. Kanmani (Manasa) is a local worker who develops affection over Vellaisamy upon being impressed by his good nature. Suddenly, Savithri passes away due to cardiac arrest. Sambasiva is terribly shocked after his wife's death, and Vellaisamy takes care of him. Meanwhile, the villagers talk ill about the relationship between Vellaisamy and Gayatri. At one instant, even Sambasiva gets angry on hearing the comments made by the public. Later, he understands the pure bonding shared between Vellaisamy and Gayatri. He feels bad for doubting them and also suddenly passes away. Gayatri is left alone following her parents’ death, and Vellaisamy decides to take care of her until she gets married. Vellaisamy takes the responsibility of getting Gayatri married to the person she likes. He approaches a judge (Visu) with a marriage proposal between Gayatri and the judge's son. The judge is also interested in the proposal as he is surprised to see a person who takes all the effort to get someone married who is not related to him. However, on the day of the marriage, a few people come to the wedding hall and make some bad comments about Vellaisamy and Gayatri. The judge suddenly asks Vellaisamy and ties the knot with Gayatri. Everyone is shocked, including Vellaisamy and Gayatri. Now, the judge reveals that he knows very well that the relationship that exists between Vellaisamy and Gayatri is pure, which can be seen based on their reaction hearing marriage arrangements between them. The judge says that he has the ability to judge people based on their expression. He says that he trusts the relationship between Vellaisamy and Gayatri. Gayatri eventually gets married to the judge's son.

Cast

Parthiban as Vellaichamy
Preetha Vijayakumar as Gayatri
Manasa as Kanmani
K. Viswanath as Sambasiva Iyer (Voice dubbed by Delhi Kumar)
Lakshmi as Savithri
Visu as Judge
Vadivelu 
Satya Prakash as Sulur Subramaniam, Gayatri's cousin
Cochin Haneefa as Kanmani's father
Rajeev
Mohan Raman
S. S. Chandran 
Thyagu 
Pandu as Pannaiyar
 Gowthami Vembunathan

Soundtrack

The film score and the soundtrack were composed by Ilaiyaraaja. The soundtrack, released in 2000, features 7 tracks with lyrics written by R. V. Udayakumar.

Reception

B. Balaji of Thenisai.com gave the film 2.5 out of 5. He said : "Vasu spends a lot of time showing the mutually loving relationship between Parthiban and K. Viswanath. These scenes are overdone just a little bit and some artificiality permeates the frames. Lakshmi doesn't help with her overacting. Parthiban is subdued and barring a few occasional wordplays, doesn't display much of the talkative persona he usually adopts in movies.
The twist in the middle is obvious from early on but does perk up interest in the proceedings. Unfortunately Vasu squanders this with lame characterizations and obvious attempts at setting the stage for later proceedings. The villain's character is a brazen caricature and his acts lack even basic common sense. Similarly, K.Vishwanath's solemn oath that he would never bear giving a flawed judgement is an obvious setup for later happenings. The director regains some ground in the concluding portions. They move fast without any unnecessary complications dragging the predictable conclusion. And the way the final act is executed is very effective and touching.
Parthiban and Vadivelu have made an effective comedy pair from Bharathi Kannamma. The director cleverly capitalises on this fact by making Vadivelu wonder who Parthiban is, the first time they come eye-to-eye. But instead of stopping with that, he overdoes it and their meetings from then onwards feel like retreads of their scenes in the earlier movie. Vadivelu's solo comedy is in fact more enjoyable.
Preeta does her part satisfactorily and is effective in the emotional scenes. Rajeev is wasted in an inconsequential role.".

References

External links

2000 films
Films scored by Ilaiyaraaja
2000s Tamil-language films
Films directed by P. Vasu